The 1849 California gubernatorial election was held on November 13, 1849, to elect the first governor of California. Peter Hardeman Burnett won in a five-way race.

Results

References

1849
California
gubernatorial
November 1849 events